Worsøe is a Scandinavian surname. Notable people with the surname include:
 Claus Nieuwejaar Worsøe
 Laura Worsøe

Danish-language surnames
Norwegian-language surnames